At least eight ships of the Royal Danish Navy have borne the name HDMS Havfruen: between 1563 and 1961.  Included in these are
  ship-of-the-line (designed by O Judichaer)
  frigate (designed by F M Krabbe)
  frigate (designed by E W Stibolt)
  frigate (designed by A Schifter)
 
 , a

References

Royal Danish Navy ship names